Omoglymmius perplexus is a species of beetle in the subfamily Rhysodidae. It was described by R.T. Bell and J.R. Bell in 1985. It is known from Sumatra (Indonesia).

Omoglymmius perplexus holotype, a female, measures  in length.

References

perplexus
Beetles of Indonesia
Endemic fauna of Sumatra
Beetles described in 1985